The Africana Cultures and Policy Studies Institute (ACPSI) is a professional policy studies organization that promotes an academic analysis of Africana cultures and policies under the rubric of various disciplines commonly referred to as Africana studies, Black studies, or Africology. This Institute provides the opportunity for an intellectual community (that is a cadre of trained or apprenticed critical thinkers) to examine and explain global linkages, interactions, identities, transformations, redemptions, and dilemmas of African people in the Diaspora. ACPSI uses the dissemination of scholarship to encourage the development of policies that benefit the quality of life for all African people in the Diaspora.

Short history of the development of ACPSI
ACPSI began in a series of meeting held by the Intellectual Society that occurred from 1999-2001. These meeting were inspired by Babacar M'Baye, Robert Smith and Zachery Williams at Bowling Green State University. The earliest discussion revolved around an integration of cultural theory, policy studies, international relations and history.

The next major development leading to ACPSI occurred during the summer of 2000-2001. After traveling to Ghana and Benin to study Africanisms with Lillian Ashcraft-Eason and Djisovi Ikukomi Eason. Robert Smith had visited the continent the previous year to complete studies in Ghana and Nigeria, in the same Africana Studies sponsored program. Coupled with Babacar M'Baye's roots in Dakar, Senegal and each of their abiding interests in Pan-Africanism, these events further fueled the early gestation period of the concept which would become Africana Cultures and Policy Studies.

Sometime in October 2005, ACPSI addressed their paradigm first collective panel at the Association for the Study of African-American Life and History (ASALH) Conference in Pittsburgh and made plans from that point forward on continuing the collectivization and organization of the Institute. Interspersed between conference sessions and presentations, we held working sessions on the Institute. Floyd Beachum developed the Organizational Diagram. Robert Smith developed the mission statement and an initial conceptual agenda of relative subject matter to the Institute. Zachery Williams was elected as the first executive director of the Institute largely stemming from the promotion of his vision of an integrated think-tank and policy advocacy institution and his background in black intellectualism.

On June 10–12, the 2005-Second Annual Meeting was held in Charlotte, NC. This session was hosted by Robert Smith in the University of North Carolina—Charlotte Department of African and African American Studies.

Theory and practice of Africana cultures and policy studies 
The Joint Center for Political and Economic Studies, TransAfrica Forum, Institute of the Black World have all influenced the ACPSI paradigm in an effort to re-examine the connections between Africana Studies and policy studies.

Africana cultures and policy studies (ACPS) has been interpreted differently by the fellows of ACPSI.  Generally, the consensus exists that ACPS is an integrated, interdisciplinary investigations between the people, cultural practices and their environment.

Key contributors to ACPS have been Zachery Williams, Floyd Beachum, Babacar M'Baye, Robert Smith, Carlos McCray, Tim Lake and Seneca Vaught.

Williams' major contribution to ACPS has centered on an evaluation of policies on a local, national, and transnational/international level.  In the Williams school, ACPS dialogues with Africana Studies, Global Policy Studies, American Culture Studies, as well as more traditional disciplines including but not limited to history, education, philosophy, religion, law, English, etc. The policy process is addressed from a top-down and a bottom-up perspective enabling ACPS to serve as a bridge between theory and practice effectively connecting academia, various community constituencies, and related institutions. 
Furthermore, ACPS links culture studies and policy studies in a systematic manner that promotes the critical examination and evaluation of cultural issues such as continuity and change or dislocation, thereby applying such analysis to the policy research and development process.

Smith has emphasized the importance of law in his contributions to ACPS. The relationship between policy and people have driven particular questions the role of law and policy on African American identity and opportunity. Research into the impacts of various types of legislation and case law highlights the unique convergence of race and law. Vaught's contributions to the discourse of ACPS have followed in a similar fashion.  Vaught has broadly defined the role of ACPS as rooted in a policy concept of relationships vying for increased power through social contracts that are largely informed by cultural experiences.

Published Work
In 2009, the ACPSI published Africana Cultures and Policy Studies: Scholarship and the Transformation of Public Policy.  In this work edited by Zachery Williams, the contributors explored interdisciplinary approaches to African Studies, African American Studies, and critical race theory rooted in the historical experiences of people of African descent and focused on policy development, analysis, and practical application. The work was published in Palgrave MacMillan's Contemporary Black History Series edited by Peniel Joseph and the late Manning Marable. Contributors to the volume included Nathaniel Norment, Jr., Wornie Reed, Loretta Prater, and Greg Childs.

References

External links
 The Africana Cultures and Policy Studies Institute Website
 National Council for Black Studies
 Africana Cultures and Policy Studies: Scholarship and the Transformation of Public Policy

African studies
Ethnic studies organizations